Mostovka is a rural locality (a selo) in Pribaykalsky District, Republic of Buryatia, Russia. The population was 889 as of 2010. There are 17 streets.

Geography 
Mostovka is located 48 km southwest of Turuntayevo (the district's administrative centre) by road. Talovka is the nearest rural locality.

References 

Rural localities in Okinsky District